Rohaniella is a genus of moths in the family Saturniidae. The genus was erected by Eugène Louis Bouvier in 1927.

Species
Rohaniella guineensis Bouvier, 1927
Rohaniella pygmaea (Maassen & Weymer, 1885)

References

External links
"Gattung: Rohaniella". Saturniidae World. (Note: This source gives the authority for Rohaniella pygmaea as "(Maassen & Weyding 1885)".

Saturniinae
Taxa named by Eugène Louis Bouvier